Luis Alfonso Espino García (born 5 January 1992), commonly known as Pacha Espino, is a Uruguayan professional footballer who plays as a left back for Spanish club Cádiz.

Club career
Born in San Jacinto, Espino joined Nacional's youth setup in 2012, from Miramar Misiones. He made his senior debut on 1 February 2014, starting in a 2–0 away win against Racing Montevideo for the Uruguayan Primera División championship.

Espino scored his first senior goal on 24 April 2016, netting the game's only in a home defeat of Fénix. A regular starter, he lifted the 2014–15 and 2016 league titles with the club.

On 28 January 2019, Espino moved abroad for the first time in his career after agreeing to a two-and-a-half-year contract with Segunda División side Cádiz CF.

International career
On 7 January 2022, Espino was named in Uruguay's 50-man preliminary squad for FIFA World Cup qualifying matches against Paraguay and Venezuela. On 21 October 2022, he was named in Uruguay's 55-man preliminary squad for the 2022 FIFA World Cup.

Career statistics

Club

References

External links

1992 births
Living people
People from Canelones Department
Uruguayan footballers
Association football defenders
Uruguayan Primera División players
La Liga players
Segunda División players
Club Nacional de Football players
Cádiz CF players
Uruguayan expatriate footballers
Uruguayan expatriate sportspeople in Spain
Expatriate footballers in Spain